The Perodua Rusa is a cab over microvan manufactured by the Malaysian automaker Perodua between 1996 and 2007, and based on the Daihatsu Zebra. Launched on March 6, 1996, the Rusa is the first van model to be produced by a Malaysian automotive company. The original model received a 1.3-litre engine, followed by the 1.6-litre model on 14 May 1997.

Models 
Three variations of Rusa vans are offered: The CX (1.3-litre, two seat version), the EX (1.3 litre, five seat version) and the GX (1.6-litre, seven seat version). The CX is primarily intended to serve as a freight vehicle, while the EX and GX are intended for private use. The van is also used by Malaysian police and fire fighting forces.

The vehicle's name "Rusa" is the Malay translation of "Deer". Later replaced by the Perodua logo, the van's original logo was a galloping deer.

Specifications

Gallery

References

External links 
 Perodua Malaysia
 Perodua Rusa at perodua.co.uk

Rusa
Cab over vehicles
Microvans
Vans
Vehicles introduced in 1996
Rear-wheel-drive vehicles